A partial solar eclipse occurred on July 1, 2011. A solar eclipse occurs when the Moon passes between Earth and the Sun, thereby totally or partly obscuring the image of the Sun for a viewer on Earth. A partial solar eclipse occurs in the polar regions of the Earth when the center of the Moon's shadow misses the Earth.
This is the first solar eclipse of Saros series 156, only visible as a partial solar eclipse in a small area south of South Africa and north of Antarctica. At greatest eclipse, the magnitude was just 0.097. It is the first new saros series to begin since saros 155 began with the partial solar eclipse of June 17, 1928. The eclipse belonged to Saros 156 and was number 1 of 69 eclipses in the series. Thus, the 2011 Jul 01 event was the first eclipse of the series.

This eclipse is the third of four partial solar eclipses in 2011, with the others occurring on January 4, 2011, June 1, 2011 and November 25, 2011.

Images
Animated path

Related eclipses

Eclipses of 2011 
 A partial solar eclipse on January 4.
 A partial solar eclipse on June 1.
 A total lunar eclipse on June 15.
 A partial solar eclipse on July 1.
 A partial solar eclipse on November 25.
 A total lunar eclipse on December 10.

Solar eclipses 2008–2011

Metonic series

References

External links

http://eclipse.gsfc.nasa.gov/SEplot/SEplot2001/SE2011Jul01P.GIF

2011 07 01
2011 in science
2011 07 01
July 2011 events